Drăguşeni may refer to:

Romania
 Drăgușeni, Botoșani, a commune in Botoşani County
 Drăgușeni, Galați, a commune in Galaţi County
 Drăgușeni, Iași, a commune in Iaşi County
 Drăguşeni, Suceava, a commune in Suceava County
 Drăguşeni, a village in Turulung Commune, Satu Mare County

Moldova
 Drăguşeni, a village in Bobeica Commune, Hînceşti district
 Drăguşeni, a village in Rădeni, Străşeni

See also 
 Drăgan (disambiguation)